Gumaa Al-Shawan (né Ahmed Al-Hawan; 1 July 1937 – 1 November 2011) was an Egyptian spy who worked for the Israeli Mossad from 1967 until 1973. He provided the Israelis with false military information with the help of the Egyptian General Intelligence Directorate.

Biography
Ahmed Al-Hawan was born and raised in Suez. He and his family left after Israel occupied the Sinai Peninsula during the 1967 War. His wife Fatima reportedly lost her eyesight due to an Israeli air strike and they moved to Cairo.

Mossad
When Al-Hawan couldn't find a job in Cairo, he traveled to Greece to earn his living on a ship. He met a woman with whom he fell in love, but who was reportedly a Mossad agent and who convinced him to work at her father's company. There he met an undercover Mossad agent posing as a Syrian who asked Al-Hawan to return to Egypt and gather information regarding the ships that were sailing in the Egyptian channel.

Egyptian Intelligence
Al-Hawan opened a grocery store and began to collect information for his bosses but he soon developed some doubts about their intentions. He went to the headquarters of the General Intelligence Service (GIS) and met with Rais Zakariya (General Mohammed Abdul Salam Al-Mahgoub) whom he informed him about his experiences with the people he worked with. The GIS recruited him to provide the Israelis with false information for the next six years.

Israel provided Al-Hawan with the most advanced transmitting device at the time, but once Al-Hawan arrived in Egypt he sent a message with it saying, "From Egyptian intelligence to Mossad, thank you for your cooperation with us during the recent period."

Retirement
In January 1976, while collecting some info for the Mossad under the supervision of the Egyptian intelligence, an army vehicle hit Al-Hawan causing him a major injury in his right leg that he says could have easily been cured, had the doctors been more competent. The injury was followed by damage to the right eye as a result of using invisible ink. He requested retirement which was approved by President Sadat in December 1977.

Popular culture
His story was made into a drama series titled Tears in Insolent Eyes دموع في عيون وقحة starring Adel Emam as Gumaa Al-Shawan.

Death
Gumaa Al-Shawan died on 1 November 2011 at the age of 74 after suffering from an unknown illness. For several months he was treated at a medical facility of the armed forces.

See also
 Refaat Al-Gammal
 Heba Selim
 Ibrahim Shaheen and Inshirah Moussa

References

External links
 http://www.fayoum.edu.eg/english/newsdetail.aspx?news_id=97
 https://web.archive.org/web/20110406010418/http://ct.tarekshalaby.com/component/content/article/36-real-people/138-the-fascinating-life-of-egypts-most-famous-spy

1937 births
2011 deaths
Egyptian spies
Place of death missing
People from Suez
Double agents